John Edward Bloundelle-Burton (1850 - 11 December 1917) was an English novelist. Having worked as a journalist for The London Standard, he began writing novels in 1885, publishing 60 works in total.

Selected works
The Silent Short (1886)
Desert Ship (1890)
Denounced (1896)
A Bitter Heritage (1899)
A Branded Name (1903)
A Woman from the Sea (1907)
Last of her Race (1908)
Love Lies Bleeding (1914)

References

'English Novelist Dies', The New York Times, 12 December 1917.
'Mr. J. E. Bloundelle-Burton', The Times, 12 December 1917.
A Short Biographical Dictionary of English Literature by John W. Cousin (John William Cousin), 1849–1910.

External links
 
 

1850 births
1917 deaths
19th-century English novelists
20th-century English novelists
English male journalists
English male novelists
19th-century English male writers
20th-century English male writers